Sergeant Clyde A. Thomason (May 23, 1914 – August 17, 1942) was a United States Marine who posthumously received the Medal of Honor for heroism at the cost of his life while leading an assault in the Makin Islands on August 17, 1942. Thomason was the first enlisted Marine to receive the Medal of Honor during World War II.

Early years; first Marine Corps service
Clyde A. Thomason was born in Atlanta, Georgia on May 23, 1914, and after his graduation from high school there, traveled widely throughout the United States in a "jalopy" with companions. In December 1934, he enlisted in the United States Marine Corps in Savannah, Georgia. Although he was named for his father, at the time of his enlistment he dropped the "A" of his father's name and became known in the Marine Corps simply as Clyde Thomason. This was the name under which he enlisted in 1934 and was the name subsequently used in official Marine Corps records. The day following his discharge, he was retained in the Fleet Marine Force Reserve. When he again became a civilian, he accepted a position with the Albany, Georgia, branch of the Fire Companies Adjustment Bureau, Inc., and Albany became his home in February 1940.

World War II
Thomason re-enlisted in the Marine Corps Reserve in January 1942 following the attack on Pearl Harbor. He asked for action, and when Lt. Col. Evans Carlson was organizing his famous Raiders, Thomason volunteered.

He received his training in California before going to the Pacific battlefields in April for duty with the 2nd Raider Battalion.

Letters that he wrote to friends in Albany, Georgia during the time of his service in the Pacific show that he wanted to be "where things are happening." He refused to accept assignments which would keep him away from action.

He wrote of his commanding officer, Lt.Col. Carlson, and of Maj. James Roosevelt, second in command. Lt.Col. Carlson thought so highly of Sgt. Thomason that he selected him to lead the advance element against the Japanese garrison at Butaritari. It was there that Sgt. Thomason's gallantry in action earned him the Medal of Honor.

Sgt. Thomason was one of 30 Marines who did not return from the Makin Island raid. In November 1999, researchers discovered a mass grave on Makin Island that contained human remains, equipment, and dog tags belonging to Marine Raiders. Sgt. Thomason's remains were among those identified. His remains were returned to the United States and were interred at Arlington National Cemetery.

Posthumous honors

The Medal of Honor was conferred posthumously and was presented to his stepmother by Under-Secretary of the Navy, James Forrestal, at ceremonies in January 1943 in Washington, D.C.

In 1957, in ceremonies at the Marine Corps Supply Center, Albany, Georgia, a new gymnasium building was formally dedicated in Sgt Thomason's name.

In May 1984, a Staff Non-Commissioned Officers Barracks was named for Sgt. Thomason at the Marine Corps Base, Camp Smedley D. Butler, in Okinawa, Japan.

On December 17, 2004, the Sgt. Clyde Thomason Amphibious Skills Training Facility was dedicated on Coronado Island, California.

On August 17, 2001, Sgt Thomason's remains were re-interred in Arlington National Cemetery, Arlington, Virginia.

On February 18, 2009, the Marine Corps League Detachment #1325 named in his honor was formed in Fayette County, Ga.

The MARSOC Critical Skills Operator (CSO) of the Year award presented at the Marine Corps Association and Foundation Ground Awards Dinner on May 5, 2016, was renamed in his honor to the Sergeant Clyde A. Thomason Marine Special Operator of the Year Special Operations Command Award

Medal of Honor citation
The President of the United States takes pride in presenting the MEDAL OF HONOR posthumously to

for service as set forth in the following CITATION:
For conspicuous gallantry and intrepidity at the risk of his life above and beyond the call of duty while a member of the Second Marine Raider Battalion in action against the Japanese-held island of Makin on August 17–18, 1942. Landing the advance element of the assault echelon, Sergeant Thomason disposed his men with keen judgment and discrimination and by his exemplary leadership and great personal valor, exhorted them to like fearless efforts. On one occasion, he dauntlessly walked up to a house which concealed an enemy Japanese sniper, forced in the door and shot the man before he could resist. Later in the action, while leading an assault on enemy position, he gallantly gave up his life in the service of his country. His courage and loyal devotion to duty in the face of grave peril were in keeping with the finest traditions of the United States Naval Service.

Awards and decorations
Thomason received the following military awards:

See also

List of Medal of Honor recipients for World War II

Notes

References

External links

1914 births
1942 deaths
Burials at Arlington National Cemetery
United States Marine Corps Medal of Honor recipients
United States Marine Corps non-commissioned officers
United States Marine Corps personnel killed in World War II
People from Atlanta
Marine Raiders
World War II recipients of the Medal of Honor
United States Marine Corps reservists